Clavaria amoena, sometimes called the yellow coral fungus, is a species of coral fungus in the family Clavariaceae. It appears to be distributed in temperate areas of the southern hemisphere.

References

Clavariaceae
Fungi described in 1844
Fungi of Australia
Fungi of New Zealand
Taxa named by Heinrich Zollinger
Taxa named by Alexander Moritzi